Hunted by the Sky is a fantasy novel by Tanaz Bhathena that was published in 2020. It won the 2021 White Pine Award.

Reception 
The book was reviewed by Quill & Quire, The Hindu, and The New Indian Express.

See also 
 A Girl Like That (novel)
 The Beauty of the Moment

References 

2020 Canadian novels
2020s fantasy novels
Books by Tanaz Bhathena